David Clarke (born 27 November 1983) is a Gaelic footballer who plays for Ballina Stephenites. He also played for the Mayo county team until his retirement in 2021.

He played in the 2006 All-Ireland Final defeat to Kerry and the 2012 All-Ireland final which Mayo lost by 0-13 to 2-11 against Donegal. He also played in the 2016 All-Ireland Final against Dublin, starting the first match before being dropped for the second, only to come on as a second-half substitute to face a penalty he was unable to save; Mayo lost by a single point.
Clarke announced his retirement from inter county football in January 2021.

References

1983 births
Living people
Ballina Stephenites Gaelic footballers
Gaelic football goalkeepers
Garda Síochána officers
Mayo inter-county Gaelic footballers
People from Castlebar